Allard Jan van der Scheer (21 August 1928 – 10 January 2014) was a Dutch actor.

Allard van der Scheer died on 10 January 2014, aged 85, in Muiderberg, North Holland. He was survived by his wife and their two daughters, including actress Veronique.

References

External links

1928 births
2014 deaths
Male actors from The Hague
Dutch male film actors
Dutch male television actors
Dutch male stage actors
20th-century Dutch people